Rachide Forbes Vandinho Barreto (born 20 June 1989), known as Forbes, is a Bissau-Guinean professional footballer who plays for Salgueiros as a forward.

Club career
Forbes signed for Sporting de Covilhã on 21 June 2013, and scored his first goal on the 14 August 2013 against Feirense.

Personal
His uncle Forbs played 11 seasons in the Primeira Liga.

References

External links

1989 births
Living people
Bissau-Guinean footballers
Association football forwards
Primeira Liga players
S.C. Braga players
Segunda Divisão players
Varzim S.C. players
Liga Portugal 2 players
S.C. Covilhã players
Vitória F.C. players
Académico de Viseu F.C. players
Anadia F.C. players
S.C. Salgueiros players
Expatriate footballers in Portugal
Bissau-Guinean expatriate sportspeople in Portugal